Eric Descombes (born 25 June 1971) is an association football manager and former player. Born in Ivory Coast, he was naturalized by Mauritania and participated with the Mauritanian national team in the World Cup qualifiers for Germany 2006. He spent his career between Europe and the United States, playing with clubs such as Chico Rooks, Cascade Surge, Sacramento Scorpions, Southend United, New Orleans Storm, Cincinnati Riverhawks and Indiana Blast. He capped twice for the Mauritanian national team and played in 169 games at the professional level, scoring 16 times.

Descombes started his professional coaching career in the A-League with the Cincinnati Riverhawks as a player-assistant coach and with the Indiana Blast as a head coach. He was the head coach and GM with Africa Sports d'Abidjan in Ivory Coast (2012/2013 season). He was named as the new national team coach and technical director of the Central African Republic, shortly after. The team participated in the CEMAC Cup in December 2013, while the civil war just had started. He led the team to a final appearance, after defeating Chad (1–0), Congo (1-0), and Cameroon (1-0), but falling to host country Gabon (0–2) in the final.

In January 2017, Descombes was named as the Director of Football with FC Mulhouse in France, overseeing the club's entire sport side, from the youth academy to the first team. In July 2018 he was named as the club's new manager.In his first season at the helm, he won the league championship and promotion to the next division, and a coach of the year accolade.

.

References

1971 births
Living people
Footballers from Yaoundé
Cameroonian footballers
Association football defenders
Canon Yaoundé players
Diamant Yaoundé players
Chico Rooks players
Cascade Surge players
Sacramento Scorpions players
Southend United F.C. players
New Orleans Storm players
Cincinnati Riverhawks players
Indiana Blast players
USISL players
A-League (1995–2004) players
Cameroonian expatriate footballers
Cameroonian expatriate sportspeople in the United States
Expatriate soccer players in the United States
Cameroonian expatriate sportspeople in England
Expatriate footballers in England
Cameroonian football managers
Player-coaches
Central African Republic national football team managers
Cameroonian expatriate football managers
Expatriate soccer managers in the United States
Expatriate football managers in Ivory Coast
Expatriate football managers in the Central African Republic
Cameroonian people of French descent
People with acquired French citizenship
French footballers
Olympique Lyonnais players
Toulouse FC players
French football managers
FC Mulhouse managers
French expatriate football managers
French sportspeople of Cameroonian descent
Naturalized citizens of Mauritania
Mauritania international footballers
Mauritanian footballers